Christopher Shyer (sometimes credited as Chris Shyer) is a Canadian-American actor who has appeared in over 50 film and television roles.

Acting career
Shyer has appeared in multiple guest roles on television since 1994, including: Viper, The New Outer Limits, Smallville, Monk, JAG, CSI: Miami, CSI: Crime Scene Investigation, and a critically acclaimed recurring role as the Hannibal Lecter-like character "Lawrence O'Malley" in The Practice. He more recently appeared in a supporting role on ABC-TV's re-imagined V series as "Marcus," second-in-command to the V high commander, Anna (Morena Baccarin).

His varied film roles have included The Falling (1998, as "Lars"), The Invitation (2003, as "Joel Gellman"), The Lazarus Child (2004, as "John Boyd"), Fierce People (2005, as "Dr. Leffler"), and Big Bad Wolf (2006, as "Charlie Cowley").

He has also starred on Broadway as "Sam" in Mamma Mia and "Dean Newhouse" in Going Down Swingin''', following successful stints in the Canadian productions of Miss Saigon, Les Misérables, Phantom of the Opera and Sunset Boulevard''.

Filmography

Film

Television

References

External links

Year of birth missing (living people)
Living people
Canadian male film actors
Canadian male television actors